The Central District of Semnan County is a district (bakhsh) in Semnan County, Semnan Province, Iran. At the 2006 census, its population was 135,872, in 39,101 families.  The District has one city: Semnan. The District has one rural district (dehestan): Howmeh Rural District.

References 

Districts of Semnan Province
Semnan County